According to the European Commission Directorate-General for Trade. The 10 largest trading partners of the European Union with their total trade (sum of imports and exports) in millions of euro for calendar year 2021 are as follows. In the table, a positive trade balance means that the EU exports more than it imports from the given country.

With United Kingdom withdrawal from the European Union, United Kingdom enters the top ten partners of the EU-27.

See also
European Union free trade agreements
List of the largest trading partners of the ASEAN
List of the largest trading partners of India
List of the largest trading partners of the United States
List of the largest trading partners of the People's Republic of China

References

Foreign relations of the European Union
Foreign trade of the European Union
Economy of the European Union
Economy-related lists of superlatives
Lists of  trading partners